Protist is a peer-reviewed scientific journal focusing on protists. It was founded as Archiv für Protistenkunde by editor Fritz Shaudinn in 1902, and originally published by Gustav Fischer and later Jena. The journal is now published by Elsevier, and is currently edited by Michael Melkonian (Botanical Institute, University of Cologne). The journal changed its name to Protist in 1998.

Abstracting and indexing
The journal is abstracted and indexed in the following bibliographic databases:

According to the Journal Citation Reports, the journal has a 2017 impact factor of 2.702.

References

Further reading

External links

Publications established in 1902
English-language journals
Biology journals
Elsevier academic journals
Bimonthly journals